Cathy Hobbs is an American television host, interior designer and lifestyle expert based in New York City.

Broadcasting career
Hobbs began her broadcast career at KGET-TV in Bakersfield, California, while still a student at the University of Southern California. In 1991, she joined WOLO-TV in Columbia, South Carolina, as its “featured night-beat” reporter. After a year, she moved to WSMV-TV in Nashville, Tennessee. She then worked for WRC-TV, the Washington D.C. NBC station, and joined WPIX in April 1997. In 2009, she left the WPIX news team to launch the real estate and design television series, Metro Residential, which also airs on PIX; she is the co-host, and executive producer of the program. In January 2014, Hobbs launched Design Recipes, a real estate and design series named after her popular interior design/home staging company based in NYC, which airs on WPIX-TV in which she is the host, executive producer and owner. WPIX-TV airs the program across a host of multi-media platforms. Hobbs also writes a weekly article series called Design Recipes, nationally syndicated through Tribune Content Agency.

She is also one of the designers on HGTV Canada's show Top 10.

Hobbs has been nominated for 19 Emmy Awards and is a five-time Emmy award winner. In 2003 Hobbs was awarded an Emmy Award for Outstanding General Assignment and Live Reporter for the entire New York City region.

Interior design career
Cathy Hobbs is the founder of Cathy Hobbs Design Recipes, an interior design and home staging firm based in New York City. Her professional credentials include ASID, NCIDQ and LEED AP.
On June 6, 2011, HGTV announced that Cathy Hobbs is among its group of 12 finalists for Season 6 of HGTV's Design Star.   On September 19, 2012, Mythic Paint, the world's first zero-volatile organic compounds (VOCs), zero-toxins and non-carcinogenic high performance paint announced Cathy Hobbs as its new exclusive brand ambassador.  Mythic Paint also announced the release of a 12-color paint collection under the Cathy Hobbs Design Recipes brand. Hobbs is the Brand Ambassador for British based lifestyle brand Plain Lazy in which she is developing her own Design Recipes branded line of youth bedding.

Awards
 1995 Emmy Award, for A Testament of Friendship and Faith
 2002 New York Emmy Award, for Get Out Alive
 2003 New York Emmy Award, for Outstanding On-Camera Achievement in General Assignment and Live Reporting

References

American interior designers
American television personalities
American women television personalities
University of Southern California alumni
Year of birth missing (living people)
Living people
American women interior designers
21st-century American women